Robert Anthony 'Bob' Wilkes (born 2 September 1948) is an Anglican priest. From 2006 to 2009, he was Dean of Birmingham. He was latterly Vicar of St Michael at the North Gate in Oxford.

Early life
He was educated at Pocklington School and Trinity College, Oxford.

Ordained ministry
He was ordained in 1974 and began his ecclesiastical career with a curacy at  St Oswald, Netherton, Merseyside, after which he was its Vicar until 1981 when he became Chaplain to the Bishop of Liverpool.  From 1985 to 1998 he was Regional Secretary for the CMS in Pakistan and the Middle East. In 1999 he became Team Rector for the Mossley Hill area of Liverpool. He was appointed to Dean of Birmingham Cathedral in 2006, serving for three years. He was latterly  vicar of St Michael at the North Gate, Oxford.

References

External links
Church web-site

1948 births
People educated at Pocklington School
Alumni of Trinity College, Oxford
Provosts and Deans of Birmingham
Living people